BeGood Clothing is a socially responsible clothing, and accessories online retailer based in San Francisco, California. BeGood Clothing features not only sustainable fashion and gifts that are eco-friendly, but it also gives back to an environmental or humanitarian cause for each item purchased. The company supports local San Francisco nonprofits, participates in charitable events, and donates customers’ gently used clothing to Goodwill Industries monthly.

BeGood Clothing was founded by Mark Spera and Dean Ramadan.

Products
BeGood carefully curates the brands and designers they carry in the store in an effort to improve the sustainable clothing image.   BeGood Clothing offers various clothing items from designers who associate with charities or have implemented corporate social responsibility strategies.

BeGood Outreach
BeGood has partnered with the San Francisco non-profit, Project Open Hand, and donates a meal to their organization for the sale of certain items in the store. BeGood also partners with these local and global non-profits and charitable organizations:

Project Open Hand
Goodwill Industries
Books for Africa 
Donation of clean water
Education initiatives
Toothbrush given to a child in need
Donation of prescription lenses
Eco-Causes
World Bicycle Relief
Humanitarian Initiatives

References

External links
Official Website

Online clothing retailers of the United States